Jaskinia Wielka Śnieżna ("great snowy cave") is a limestone cave system in Mount Małołączniak in the Western Tatra Mountains, of the Carpathian Mountains System, in southern Poland. The cave is within Tatra National Park.

Morphology 

Wielka Śnieżna has five entrances:

 Jaskinia Śnieżna ("snowy cave") –  – discovered in 1959
 Jaskinia nad Kotlinami ("cave over the kettles") –  – discovered in 1966, connected to Śnieżna in 1968
 Jasny Awen ("light aven") –  – first explored in 1959, connected to Wielka Śnieżna in 1978
 Jaskinia Wielka Litworowa ("great angelica cave") –  – connected to Wielka Śnieżna in 1995
 Jaskinia Wilcza ("wolf cave") –  – discovered in 1996, connected to Wielka Śnieżna in 1999

They are connected by a complicated system of shafts and passages. Several of them contain underground trickles, waterfalls, pools, or siphons. The cave is drained by a karst spring known as Lodowe Źródło ("icy spring").

Exploration 

Jaskinia Śnieżna was discovered in 1959 by cavers from Zakopane. In the subsequent years, the cave was intensively explored and connected with other caves. 

In 1972, cavers using scuba diving gear were able to push past the sump for the first time.

Exploration of the cave is still ongoing, including attempts to connect the cave to Śnieżna Studnia, second-largest cave in Poland.

See also
Caves of Poland
Tatra Mountains

References

External links 
 Jaskinia Wielka Śnieżna  – with a map

Limestone caves
Wild caves
Caves of Poland
Western Tatras
Tatra County
Landforms of Lesser Poland Voivodeship